222nd Brigade may refer to:

 222nd Mixed Brigade (Spain)
 222nd Infantry Brigade (United Kingdom)